"Too Busy Being in Love" is a song written by Victoria Shaw and Gary Burr, and recorded by American country music singer Doug Stone.  It was released in October 1992 as the second single from the album From the Heart.  The song reached the top of the Billboard Hot Country Singles & Tracks chart and on The Canadian RPM Tracks chart.

Content
In this song, the narrator says his lover inspires him so poetically that he could have been a great writer, but that he was "Too Busy Being in Love" with her to do so.

Music video
The music video was directed by Michael Merriman and premiered in late 1992.

Chart performance

Year-end charts

References

1992 singles
Doug Stone songs
Songs written by Gary Burr
Songs written by Victoria Shaw (singer)
Epic Records singles
Song recordings produced by Doug Johnson (record producer)
1992 songs